The Merchant of London is an 1832 historical play by the British writer Thomas James Serle.  It premiered at the Theatre Royal, Drury Lane on 26 April 1832. The original cast included William Macready as Scroope, Henry John Wallack as Edward Beaufort, John Cooper as Richard Fitzalan, John Pritt Harley as Flaw, and Paul Bedford as Bloodmore. It takes place in Elizabethan London.

References

Bibliography
 Downer, Alan Seymour. The Eminent Tragedian William Charles Macready. Harvard University Press, 1966. 
 McWilliam, Rohan. London's West End: Creating the Pleasure District, 1800-1914. Oxford University Press,  2020.
 Nicoll, Allardyce. A History of Early Nineteenth Century Drama 1800-1850. Cambridge University Press, 1930.

1832 plays
West End plays
British plays
Historical plays
Plays set in the 16th century
Plays set in London